Alfred George Abraham Miller (25 March 1917 – 2 August 1999), also known as Dusty Miller, was an English professional footballer and coach who played as a wing half in the Football League for Southport and Plymouth Argyle.

Miller began his career with his hometown club Portsmouth but never appeared for the first-team. He ventured into non-League football before being handed another opportunity in the Football League by Bristol Rovers. Again, he failed to break into the first-team, but a move to Southport saw him make his professional debut in 1937. Two years with Southport amounted to 32 appearances and a move to Plymouth Argyle, but World War II broke out before Miller could make any appearances for the club.

Miller spent the war years making guest appearances for Aldershot, and finally made his debut for Plymouth in 1946. After injury interrupted his return, he made a move to Colchester United in 1948, where he played just twice before becoming a member of the club's coaching staff. He was briefly caretaker manager with Claude Orrin in early 1955.

Career
Born in Portsmouth, Miller was on the books of his hometown club Portsmouth as late as 1935, but after failing to break through into the first-team, he moved into non-League football with Ryde Sports. He later made appearances for Margate before Bristol Rovers signed him in 1936.

After again failing to make a breakthrough, Miller was on the move, this time to Southport ahead of the 1937–38 season. He scored two goals in 32 appearances for the club.

Miller was signed by Plymouth Argyle in 1939, but with the outbreak of World War II he had to wait until 1946 to get his first taste of first-team football with Plymouth. Because Plymouth did not play football during the war years, Miller made guest appearances for Aldershot, playing approximately 25 times between 1942 and 1945.

Once the war was over, Miller was named captain of Argyle and made his long-awaited debut in a 3–1 win against West Ham United on 31 August 1946. He played the first eight games of the season, but injury ruled him out of the remainder of the campaign. He made just one appearance in 1947–48 and was released at the end of the season.

With injury limiting his playing time, Miller made just two appearances for his next club, Colchester United, both games within three days of one another in September 1948. Colchester kept Miller on at the end of the season as a coach, replacing the outgoing Jack Kearton. Miller and club secretary Claude Orrin took charge of first-team affairs in January 1955 after Jack Butler had tendered his resignation after suffering ill health. The pair were in charge until a new manager was appointed in Benny Fenton in March.

After leaving the game, Miller returned to his native Portsmouth, going into the grocery business.

References

1917 births
1999 deaths
Footballers from Portsmouth
Association football wing halves
English footballers
Portsmouth F.C. players
Ryde Sports F.C. players
Margate F.C. players
Bristol Rovers F.C. players
Southport F.C. players
Plymouth Argyle F.C. players
Aldershot F.C. wartime guest players
Colchester United F.C. players
English Football League players
Southern Football League players
Colchester United F.C. managers
English Football League managers
English football managers